Thunderchild First Nation is an independent Cree First Nations band government in Turtleford, Saskatchewan, Canada with no affiliation with any Tribal Council. It is located approximately 113 kilometers northwest of North Battleford. European settlement in 1909 caused the reserve to be moved by the Government of Canada from its original location near Delmas, Saskatchewan to where it now currently resides near Turtleford, Saskatchewan.

Also known as kâ-pitikônâhk (ᑳ ᐱᑎᑰᓈᕽ) in Cree, the First Nation's population is approximately 1,868 of whom approximately 630 reside on the reserve.

This reserve came about after Chief Piyesiw-awasis's headmen were forced to sign an adhesion to Treaty Six in August, 1879 at Special Area No. 4. Piyesiw-awasis was one of Big Bear's bodyguards until starvation and sickness led his people to adhere to the treaty. However, Piyesiw-awasis did not put his mark to the treaty document .

See also 
List of Indian reserves in Saskatchewan
Thunderchild 115B
Thunderchild 115C

Further reading
"Outside, The Women Cried" by Jack Funk, 1989.

External links